Neolamprologus pectoralis is a species of cichlid endemic to Lake Tanganyika where it is usually found along the lakes southwestern coast in the Democratic Republic of the Congo. This species can reach a length of  TL.  This species can also be found in the aquarium trade.

References

Büscher, H. H., 1993. Neolamprologus bifasciatus n. sp.: ein neuer Tanganijkasee-Cichlide (Cichlidae, Lamprologini). D.A.T.Z. 46(6):385–389.

pectoralis
Taxa named by Heinz Heinrich Büscher
Fish described in 1991
Fish of Lake Tanganyika